Sinogastromyzon nanpanjiangensis is a species of ray-finned fish in the genus Sinogastromyzon. It is endemic to Yunnan, China, where it is known from its type locality, the Nanpan River. It grows to  SL.

References

Sinogastromyzon
Freshwater fish of China
Endemic fauna of Yunnan
Fish described in 1987